Live at Georgia Theatre  is the fifth album and first live album by American artist Derek Trucks and The Derek Trucks Band released in 2004 (see 2004 in music). The recording marks the first appearance of the band’s newest member, vocalist Mike Mattison.

This album is one of 10 "Live jam releases of this century" according to the August issue of Guitar One magazine.

Reception

In a review for AllMusic, Thom Jurek called the album "an incendiary, soulful, and wildly adventurous set," and wrote: "This is the record to turn the heads of those who haven't gotten hip to Trucks' bottleneck magic. This performance is so inspired, so utterly spellbinding, it transcends the genre classifications it employs to get the music across."

Doug Collette of All About Jazz praised "the dual virtues of individual instrumental chops and band unity" on the album, and noted that "the profoundly imaginative approach Derek Trucks takes to electric guitar is all the more extraordinary given his comparative youth." He commented: "the purity of inspiration and execution over the course of two-plus hours will doubtless bring delight to any true aficionado of progressive music."

Writing for Jambands.com, Jesse Jarnow stated: "Despite the fact that Trucks lends his name to the outfit, the music here goes to great lengths to prove that they are, in fact, a band... The sense of interplay between them is palpable."

Track listing

Disc one
"Kam-Ma-Lay" (Trucks) – 8:53
"Gonna Move" (Pena) – 6:29
"Volunteered Slavery" (Kirk) – 4:36
"Sahib Teri Bandi/Maki Madni" (Khan) – 15:03
"Leaving Trunk" (Estes) – 4:58
"I Wish I Knew" (Billy Taylor/Dick Dallas) – 5:29
"Angola" (Shorter) – 10:12
"Feel So Bad" (Chuck Willis) – 7:41

Disc two
"For My Brother" (Trucks) – 13:28
"Sonido Alegre" (Victoriano Ramirez) – 15:15
"Joyful Noise" (Trucks) – 11:58
"So Close, So Far Away" (Kofi Burbridge) – 5:52
"Freddie's Dead" (Mayfield) – 10:20

Personnel
Derek Trucks - guitar
Todd Smallie - bass, vocals
Yonrico Scott - drums, percussion, vocals
Kofi Burbridge - keyboards, flute, vocals
Mike Mattison - lead vocals
Count M'Butu - percussion

Production and crew
Sound Engineer: Marty Wall
Band Tech: Joe Main
Tour Manager: Chris Edwards
Coach Operators: Bobby Bolton, Rick Stott
Management: Blake Budney
Booking: Wayne Forte
Recording: Marty Wall
Mixing: Marty Wall, Alex Lowe
Mastering: Alex Lowe
Art Direction: Josh Cheuse
Cover Design: Jeff Wood
Photos: Jason Chastain, Vincent Tseng, Tamera Reisiger

References

Derek Trucks live albums
Live at Georgia Theatre (The Derek Trucks Band)
Columbia Records live albums